The House at 18 Aurora Street (also known as the Scarry House) in the village of Moravia, in Cayuga County, New York, is listed on the National Register of Historic Places.

Description and history 
It is a two-story, frame Greek Revival style dwelling, constructed in about 1850. The structure is dominated by its three-bay wide, side entrance temple front.

Locally it is known as the Scarry House, after the name of a well known family that lived there for many years.

It was listed on the National Register as House at 18 Aurora Street on February 24, 1995.

References

External links

Houses on the National Register of Historic Places in New York (state)
Greek Revival houses in New York (state)
Houses in Cayuga County, New York
Wooden houses in the United States
National Register of Historic Places in Cayuga County, New York
Moravia (village), New York